Ilze Graubiņa (Riga, 8 November 1941 – 24 January 2001) was a Latvian pianist. She was trained at the Moscow Conservatory under Abram Shatskes and Jakov Flier, to whom she subsequently served as an assistant.

Graubiņa won the 1964 Johann Sebastian Bach Competition, and three years later she was appointed a teacher at the Jāzeps Vītols State Conservatory, where she has taught since; Armands Ābols, Andris Grigalis, Sandra Jalanecka, Karina Jermaka, Inese Klotina, Olga Pryadko and Victor Santapau and Manuel Angel Ramirez from Spain, have been trained under her. Her recording debut was a Johann Sebastian Bach monophonic LP for Melodiya.

References
  Music in Latvia
  Ilze Graubiņa site (www.ilzegraubin.com)

1941 births
2001 deaths
Musicians from Riga
Latvian classical pianists
20th-century classical musicians
20th-century classical pianists
People's Artists of the Latvian Soviet Socialist Republic